Braden Montgomery (born April 26, 2003) is an American college baseball pitcher and outfielder for the Stanford Cardinal.

Amateur career
Montgomery grew up in Madison, Mississippi and attended Madison Central High School. He was named the Mississippi Gatorade Player of the Year as a senior. Montgomery was considered the top high school prospect in the state.

Montgomery spent his freshman season at Stanford as a starting outfielder and also pitched for the team primarily as a reliever. He was named the Pac-12 Conference Freshman of the Year at the end of the regular season after batting .294 with 16 doubles, 18 home runs, 50 runs scored, and 57 RBIs and also posting a 5.79 ERA with 28 strikeouts over  innings pitched. He was also named a Freshmen All-American by Collegiate Baseball. After the season, Montgomery played collegiate summer baseball for the Yarmouth–Dennis Red Sox of the Cape Cod Baseball League, where he batted .250 with four home runs and 19 RBIs. He also played for the United States collegiate national team. Montgomery was named to the preseason All-Pac-12 team entering his sophomore season.

References

External links

Stanford Cardinal bio

Living people
Baseball players from Mississippi
Baseball pitchers
Baseball outfielders
Stanford Cardinal baseball players
2003 births